Lower Dauphin School District is a midsized, suburban public school district located in central Pennsylvania. According to 2000 federal census data, the district served a resident population of 22,546. By 2010, the district's population increased to 24,747 people. The educational attainment levels for the district's population (25 years old and over) were 91.2% high school graduates and 28.2% college graduates. The district is one of the 500 public school districts of Pennsylvania.

According to the Pennsylvania Budget and Policy Center, 20% of the district's pupils lived at 185% or below the Federal Poverty level as shown by their eligibility for the federal free or reduced price school meal programs in 2012. In 2009, the district residents' per capita income was $23,890 a year, while the median family income was $58,643. In Dauphin County, the median household income was $52,371. By 2013, the median household income in the United States rose to $52,100.

Lower Dauphin High School students may choose to attend Dauphin County Technical School for training in the construction and mechanical trades. The district is served by Capital Area Intermediate Unit 15 which offers a variety of services, including a completely developed K-12 curriculum that is mapped and aligned with the Pennsylvania Academic Standards (available online), shared services, a group purchasing program, and a wide variety of special education and special needs services.

Schools
The High School building is located in Hummelstown, as well as its administrative building, Price School building, and one of the elementary schools. The school district was first established in the early 1950s.

Elementary Schools
Conewago Elementary School
East Hanover Elementary School – Principal - Mrs. Lindsay Adams
Londonderry Elementary School
Nye Elementary School
South Hanover Elementary School
Secondary Schools
Lower Dauphin Middle School
Price School – alternative education and online program grades 6–11
Lower Dauphin High School

Extracurriculars
The school district offers a wide variety of clubs, activities and an extensive sports program.

Sports
The district funds:

Boys
Baseball – AAAA
Basketball- AAAA
Cross Country – Class AAA
Football – AAAA
Golf – AAA
Indoor Track and Field – AAAA
Lacrosse – AAAA
Soccer – AAA
Swimming and Diving – Class AAA
Tennis – AAA
Track and Field – AAA
Volleyball – Class AAA
Wrestling	 – AAA

Girls
Basketball – AAAA
Cheer – AAAA added 2014
Cross Country – AAA
Field Hockey – AAA
Golf – AAA added 2014
Indoor Track and Field – AAAA
Lacrosse – AAAA
Soccer (Fall) – AAA
Softball – AAAA
Swimming and Diving – AAA
Girls' Tennis – AAA
Track and Field – AAA
Volleyball – AAA

Middle School Sports

Boys
Basketball
Cross Country
Football
Soccer
Track and Field
Wrestling	

Girls
Basketball
Cross Country
Field Hockey
Softball 
Track and Field

According to PIAA directory July 2014

References

External links

School districts established in 1952
Education in Harrisburg, Pennsylvania
Susquehanna Valley
School districts in Dauphin County, Pennsylvania
1952 establishments in Pennsylvania